Bermani may refer to:

Bermani Ilir, a district (kecamatan) of Kepahiang Regency, Bengkulu, Indonesia. 
Cesare Bermani (born 1937), Italian author and historian
Gaia Bermani Amaral (born 1980), Brazilian-Italian actress, model and television presenter